The PGA Professional Championship is a golf tournament for golf club professionals and teachers who are members of the Professional Golfers' Association of America. It has been held by the PGA of America since 1968, when touring professionals split off to found the PGA Tour. It was known as the PGA Club Professional Championship until 2006 and as the PGA Professional National Championship from 2006 through 2015

Sam Snead and Bob Rosburg are the only players to win a major championship and the PGA Professional Championship. Bruce Fleisher and Larry Gilbert each would go on to win a senior major. Several other winners have had PGA Tour careers, either before or after winning the championship. The first edition in 1968 was held in early December in Scottsdale, Arizona.

The leading 20 players in the event receive an entry into that year's PGA Championship. The winner gets six exemptions into the PGA Tour for the next season, three of which must be opposite The Open Championship or World Golf Championship events. The top five finishers are also given entry into the second round of the Web.com Tour Qualifying Tournament.

Although the event gives invitations to the men's PGA event, women are eligible to compete. Those who have made the 36-hole cut include Suzy Whaley (2005) and Karen Paolozzi (2016). Paolozzi placed inside the top 20 in 2016, but was not given entry due to the "Whaley Rule," where women must play from the same tees as the men during both the sectional and national tournaments.

Eligibility
To earn entry into the PGA Professional Championship, players must have PGA membership, be certified as Class A PGA Professionals, and cannot have more than ten combined starts on professional tours (including various developmental tours, senior tours, and mini-tours) during a preceding twelve-month period, not counting majors. Players earn entry by allocations from championships of their respective PGA sections, as the defending champions of the Assistant PGA Professional Championship, or as former champions of the event.

Format
The championship is a 72-hole stroke play tournament played over four days. Currently the field consists of 312 professionals representing the 41 sections of the PGA of America. At the end of two rounds, the top 90 and ties compete in round three. After round three, the field is reduced to the leading 70 and ties. Because of the large field, two courses are used for the first two rounds. The final two rounds are played on one of those courses.

The format has varied over years:
1968–1971: Two courses used for the first two rounds. A cut after two rounds with the leading 90 and ties playing in the last two rounds.
1972–1996: Three courses used for the first three rounds. A cut after three rounds with the leading 90 and ties playing in the last round.
1997–2005: One course used. A cut after two rounds with the leading 70 and ties playing in the last two rounds.
2006–2013: Two courses used for the first two rounds. A cut after two rounds with the leading 70 and ties playing in the last two rounds.
2014–present: Two courses used for the first two rounds. A cut after two rounds with the leading 90 and ties playing in the third round and then a second cut with the leading 70 and ties playing in the last round.

From 1968 to 1996 the tournament was played in the fall, anywhere from late September to early December. From 1997 to 2018, the tournament was played in the second half of June, six to seven weeks before the PGA Championship. which was held in mid-August. With the move of the PGA Championship to May in 2019, the PGA Professional Championship was moved to late April/early May.

Qualification for the PGA Championship
The 20 leading players receive an entry into the following PGA Championship. The number of qualifiers was reduced from 40 to 25 in 1994 and then to 20 in 2006. If there is a tie for 20th place, a playoff occurs until exactly twenty advance to the PGA Championship.

With the change in dates from 1997, there were two club professional championships between the 1996 and  1997 PGA Championships. As a result only the winner of the 1996 event received an entry to the 1997 PGA Championship, 25 players qualifying through the 1997 event. The other players making the cut in the 1996 club professional championship were eligible to play in the 1997 event.

The 2020 edition of the PGA Professional Championship was cancelled due to the COVID-19 pandemic. For that year only, the 20 PGA Professionals given entry into the PGA Championship were based on a points system.

Winners

Source:

References

External links

Coverage on PGA of America web site

Golf tournaments in the United States
Golf
Recurring sporting events established in 1968
1968 establishments in Arizona